A nocturnist is a hospital-based physician who only works overnight. Most nocturnists are trained in internal medicine or family medicine and have experience in hospital medicine. However, there are nocturnists trained in other specialties, such as pediatrics. The main role of a nocturnist is to admit patients into the hospital from an emergency department, and to care for previously admitted inpatients through the night. Nocturnists differ from on-call doctors in that they work exclusively at night, rather than being on-call and also working daytime shifts. 

The average salary for a nocturnist was 2.5% lower than other hospitalists, according to a 2011 survey by the Society of Hospital Medicine and the Medical Group Management Association. Moreover, these physicians were approximately 27% less productive than other day-time physician roles. In 2019, 76.1% of hospitals reported having nocturnists on staff, primarily focused on adult and child care (68.2%). A 2015 study helped to characterize the impact of nocturnist. Compared with before implementation, there was no difference in mortality, 30-day readmissions, mean length of stay, or upgrades to intensive care with the addition of these overnight hospitalists.

References

Hospital medicine
Emergency medicine